The men's light middleweight (71 kg/156.2 lbs) Full-Contact category at the W.A.K.O. World Championships 2007 in Coimbra was the sixth heaviest of the male Full-Contact tournaments, involving twenty-two fighters from five continents (Europe, Asia, North America, South America and Oceania).  Each of the matches was three rounds of two minutes each and were fought under Full-Contact rules.

Due to the smaller than necessary numbers for a thirty-two man tournament, ten of the contestants had byes through to the second round.  The tournament gold medallist was Russia's Evgeny Grechishkin who defeated Norway's Christian Kvatningen in the final by unanimous decision.  Defeated semi finalists Ukraine's Dmytro Yatskov and Poland's Mariusz Ziętek received bronze medals.

Results

Key

See also
List of WAKO Amateur World Championships
List of WAKO Amateur European Championships
List of male kickboxers

References

External links
 WAKO World Association of Kickboxing Organizations Official Site

Kickboxing events at the WAKO World Championships 2007 Coimbra
2007 in kickboxing
Kickboxing in Portugal